Asterolasia nivea, commonly known as Bindoon starbush, is a species of weak sub-shrub that is endemic to the southwest of Western Australia. It has leathery oblong to narrow elliptical leaves and white flowers arranged in groups of about three flowers with thick-centred, shield like, star-shaped hairs on the back of the petals.

Description
The leaves are covered with star-shaped hairs. There are between fifteen and twenty stamens.

Taxonomy
This species was first formally described in 1980 by Paul Wilson who gave it the name Urocarpus niveus and published the description in the journal Nuytsia. In 1987, Wilson changed the name to Asterolasia nivea, publishing the change in the journal Nuytsia.

In 2017, Juliet A. Wege published a paper in Nuytsia suggesting that A. nivea is a white flowered form, and that the name A. nivea is a synonym of A. grandiflora. This change has been accepted by the Western Australian Herbarium but not as yet by the Australian Plant Census.

Distribution and habitat
Asterolasia nivea grows in gravel between New Norcia and  Bindoon in Western Australia.

References

nivea
Rosids of Western Australia
Plants described in 1980
Taxa named by Paul G. Wilson